Into the Great Wide Yonder is the second studio album by Danish electronic musician Trentemøller. It was released physically on May 28, 2010 in Germany, and worldwide on May 31 as digital download. The album's lead single, "Sycamore Feeling," which features vocals by Danish singer Marie Fisker, was released digitally on March 22, 2010. The Special Edition includes a DVD with the music video of "Sycamore Feeling" and a live video of "Silver Surfer, Ghost Rider Go!!!" performed at Roskilde Festival in 2009, both recorded in high-definition.

The album peaked at number two on the Danish Albums Chart. In 2014 it was awarded a double silver certification from the Independent Music Companies Association, which indicated sales of at least 40,000 copies throughout Europe.

Track listing 
All songs written by Anders Trentemøller, except where noted.

Personnel
Anders Trentemøller – composer, producer, mixing and instruments
Anders Schumann – mastering and additional mixing
Davide Rossi – strings ("The Mash and the Fury" and "Shades of Marble")
Mikael Simpson – acoustic guitar and bass ("Past the Beginning of the End"), bass ("Silver Surfer, Ghost Rider Go!!!" and "Tide")
Dorit Chrysler – theremin ("Past the Beginning of the End")
Jakob Høyer – acoustic guitar ("Sycamore Feeling")
Sune Martin – bass mandolin ("Neverglade")
Nanna Øland Fabricius – choir ("Past the Beginning of the End")
Marie Fisker – vocals and lyrics ("Sycamore Feeling")
Josephine Philip – vocals and lyrics ("...Even Though You're With Another Girl")
Fyfe Dangerfield – vocals and lyrics ("Neverglade")
Solveig Sandnes – vocals and lyrics ("Tide")

Charts

Release history

References

External links 

2010 albums
Trentemøller albums